The surface ectoderm (or external ectoderm) forms the following structures:
Skin (only epidermis; dermis is derived from mesoderm) (along with glands, hair, and nails)
Epithelium of the mouth and nasal cavity and glands of the mouth and nasal cavity
Tooth enamel (as a side note, dentin and dental pulp are formed from ectomesenchyme which is derived from ectoderm (specifically neural crest cells and travels with mesenchymal cells)
Epithelium of anterior pituitary
Lens, cornea, lacrimal gland, tarsal glands and the conjunctiva of the eye
Apical ectodermal ridge inducing development of the limb buds of the embryo.
Sensory receptors in epidermis

See also 
List of human cell types derived from the germ layers

References

External links
 https://web.archive.org/web/20071213145329/http://cwx.prenhall.com/bookbind/pubbooks/martini10/chapter18/custom3/deluxe-content.html
 

Animal developmental biology
Embryology
Ectoderm